Gideon Defoe (born 26 December 1975) is a British writer and author of The Pirates!, a series of comedy books following a group of pirates on their adventures.

Bibliography
The Pirates! series:
 The Pirates! in an Adventure with Scientists (2004)
 The Pirates! in an Adventure with Whaling (2005)
 The Pirates! in an Adventure with Communists (2006)
 The Pirates! in an Adventure with Napoleon (2008)
 The Pirates! in an Adventure with the Romantics (2012)
 Other:
 How Animals Have Sex (2005)Elite Dangerous: Docking is Difficult (2014)
 The Atlas of Extinct Countries'' (2020)

Awards 

 2012 Annie Awards: Nominated for Outstanding Achievement, Writing in an Animated Feature Production
 2002 Adecco Temp Of The Month, Victoria Street branch

References

External links 
 
  Gideon Defoe's blog.

21st-century British novelists
Living people
1975 births
British male novelists
21st-century British male writers
21st-century British non-fiction writers
British humorists
The Pirates!